The following list contains results of the 2021 Hungarian opposition primary by constituency. The winners became joint candidates of the electoral alliance United for Hungary to compete against candidates of the ruling party Fidesz in the 2022 Hungarian parliamentary election.

Budapest

District 1

District 2

District 3

District 4

District 5

District 6

District 7

District 8

District 9

District 10

District 11

District 12

District 13

District 14

District 15

District 16

District 17

District 18

Bács-Kiskun County

District 1

District 2

District 3

District 4

District 5 

Winner candidate Roland Károly Horváth withdrew his candidacy on 14 January 2022, citing health reasons. He was replaced as candidate of the joint opposition by fellow Democratic Coalition member László Molnár.

District 6

Baranya County

District 1

District 2

District 3

District 4

Békés County

District 1

District 2

District 3

District 4

Borsod-Abaúj-Zemplén County

District 1

District 2

District 3

District 4

District 5

District 6

District 7

Csongrád-Csanád County

District 1

District 2

District 3

District 4

Fejér County

District 1

District 2

District 3

District 4

District 5

Győr-Moson-Sopron County

District 1

District 2

District 3

District 4

District 5

Hajdú-Bihar County

District 1

District 2

District 3

District 4

District 5

District 6

Heves County

District 1

District 2

District 3

Jász-Nagykun-Szolnok

District 1

District 2

District 3

District 4

Komárom-Esztergom County

District 1

District 2

District 3

Nógrád County

District 1

District 2

Pest County

District 1

District 2

District 3

District 4

District 5

District 6

District 7

District 8

District 9

District 10 

Winner candidate Mihály Gér withdrew from his candidacy on 14 February 2022, after his insensitive comments  he made on social media after a deadly car accident involving him in 2016 were brought to light. He was replaced as candidate of the joint opposition by fellow Dialogue for Hungary member Rebeka Szabó.

District 11

District 12

Somogy County

District 1

District 2

District 3

District 4

Szabolcs-Szatmár-Bereg County

District 1

District 2

District 3

District 4

District 5

District 6

Tolna County

District 1

District 2

District 3

Vas County

District 1

District 2

District 3

Veszprém County

District 1

District 2

District 3

District 4

Zala County

District 1

District 2

District 3

Notes

References

Sources
 Results of the 2021 Hungarian opposition primary results by constituency

2021 in Hungary
2021 political party leadership elections
Constituencies of Hungary
Election results
Primary elections in Hungary
2021 elections in Hungary